Mariana Ysrael (born 13 April 1963) is a Guam long-distance runner. She competed in the women's marathon at the 1988 Summer Olympics. Her father, Alfred, was a businessman and philanthropist. She later became a doctor, graduating from Stanford University and the UCLA, before setting up a practice in California.

References

External links
 

1963 births
Living people
Athletes (track and field) at the 1988 Summer Olympics
Guamanian female long-distance runners
Guamanian female marathon runners
Olympic track and field athletes of Guam
Place of birth missing (living people)
21st-century American women